The Wise GT-400 "Snort" is an American two place racing aircraft that was designed by Ralph Wise.

Design and development
The GT-400 is a tandem seat, low wing, retractable tricycle gear monoplane. The fuselage is composite construction with aluminum wings.

Specifications (GT-400)

References

Racing aircraft